Nebraska Highway 84 is a highway in the northeastern part of the U.S. state of Nebraska.  Its western terminus is at  Nebraska Highway 14 in Verdigre.  Its eastern terminus is at an intersection with Nebraska Highway 15 east of Hartington.

Route description
Nebraska Highway 84 begins at an intersection with NE 14 on the east side of Verdigre.  It leaves Verdigre heading in a northeasterly direction into hilly prairieland before turning southward toward Center.  It meets NE 13 south of Center and then heads eastward through farmland into Bloomfield.  Further east, it meets NE 121 and runs concurrently northward for about a mile before splitting off to the east.  The highway crosses US 81 and continues into Hartington at an intersection with Nebraska Highway 57.  It heads north for a few blocks, running concurrently with NE 57 for about half a mile, before continuing to the east.  After leaving Hartington, it continues eastward before terminating at an intersection with Nebraska Highway 15.

Major intersections

References

External links

Nebraska Roads: NE 61-80

084
Transportation in Knox County, Nebraska
Transportation in Cedar County, Nebraska